PBP may refer to:

Organizations 
 People Before Profit, an Irish political party 
 Pittsburgh Police in Pennsylvania, U.S.
 Better Place (company), a defunct electric car company

Science and technology 

 alpha-Pyrrolidinobutiophenone (α-PBP), a stimulant
 Progressive bulbar palsy, a motor neuron disease
 Picture by picture, two TV pictures side-by-side, similar to picture-in-picture (PiP)

Proteins 
 Penicillin-binding proteins involved in bacterial cell wall synthesis
 Presenilin binding protein, also known as Dock3 or MOCA, a protein involved in cell signaling
 Poly(A)-binding protein, which binds to the tail of messenger RNA

Other uses 
 Paris–Brest–Paris, an endurance cycling event
 Payback period
 Play-by-post role-playing game, a game played through online forum posts
 IATA code for Punta Islita Airport, Costa Rica
 Partners in the Blue Pacific, an informal group aimed at boosting economic and diplomatic ties with Pacific island nations